Peter Húževka (born 9 September 1976) is a Slovak professional ice hockey player currently playing for MsHK Žilina of the Slovak Extraliga.

References

External links
 
 

1976 births
Living people
HC Košice players
HC Olomouc players
ŠHK 37 Piešťany players
Slovak ice hockey forwards
HK Dubnica players
HK Dukla Trenčín players
HC Vítkovice players
Yertis Pavlodar players
MsHK Žilina players
People from Púchov
Sportspeople from the Trenčín Region
Slovak expatriate ice hockey players in the Czech Republic
Expatriate ice hockey players in Kazakhstan
Slovak expatriate sportspeople in Kazakhstan